The Paññāsāstra University of Cambodia (PUC) is a private university located in Phnom Penh, Cambodia. It was originally established in 1997, and opened in 2000. It provides an English-based education in all subjects, and is accredited by the Royal Government of Cambodia's Ministry of Education, Youth and Sports. This private university was established by the former Minister of Education, Youth and Sports, Dr. Kol Pheng.

Faculties 

Architecture & Design
Arts, Letters, and Humanities
Business and Economics
Law & Public Affairs
Education
Mathematics, Sciences and Engineering
Communication & Media Arts
Social Sciences & International Relations
 Graduate School of Management & Economics

See also 
Paññāsāstra International School

Notes

References

External links 
 

Universities in Cambodia